The Cascade Locks Work Center, in Mount Hood National Forest near the town of Cascade Locks, Oregon, was built by the Civilian Conservation Corps in 1936. It was listed on the National Register of Historic Places in 1986 for its architecture. The Rustic style structures were designed by the architects of the United States Forest Service. The listing includes three contributing buildings on a  parcel.  Historically the Work Center has been used as a single dwelling and a warehouse.

See also
National Register of Historic Places listings in Hood River County, Oregon

References

United States Forest Service
Park buildings and structures on the National Register of Historic Places in Oregon
Government buildings completed in 1936
Buildings and structures in Hood River County, Oregon
Civilian Conservation Corps in Oregon
National Register of Historic Places in Hood River County, Oregon
1936 establishments in Oregon